Kenneth W. Maddox (born February 29, 1964 in Long Beach, California), also known as Ken Lopez-Maddox is a former California State Assemblyman who served from 1998 until 2004, representing part of Orange County.

He received his bachelor of science degree from California Polytechnic State University, Pomona and is a member of the fraternity Sigma Phi Epsilon.  He has his master of arts degree in management from National University and was a past Senior Fellow of Public Policy at UCLA. 

He was a deputy sheriff for Los Angeles County and a police officer in Tustin prior to his election to the Assembly. He remained a reserve police officer during his tenure in the legislature. He has also been a volunteer firefighter, and served in the Army National Guard and Army Reserve from 1981 to 1989.  He received a Reserve Commission in the United States Army while attending the University of Texas at Arlington and was branched Armor.  He returned to service in the military following the September 11 attacks.

Ken Lopez-Maddox is a member of the Lutheran Church Missouri Synod

Assembly career
He was elected to the Assembly in November 1998.

While in the legislature, Maddox served on a variety of policy committees including Public Safety, Insurance, Utilities and Commerce, Governmental Organization, Environmental Safety and Toxics, Agriculture, Education and Local Government.  He served on the Select Committee on Elder Abuse and the Select Committee on Police Conduct among others.  He received the Order of California from Governor Gray Davis for his efforts on behalf of military veterans.

He authored California's Amber Alert, Safe Surrender for Newborns and ocean water quality legislation to protect Huntington Beach's coastline and marine life.  He was once the bassist for the Huntington Beach surf punk band, The Ziggens.

He was also the Republican lead on the investigation into corruption at the Department of Insurance.

Prior to serving in the legislature, he served on the Garden Grove City Council. Maddox oversaw major resort developments along the Harbor Corridor south of Disneyland. He was also highly involved in the construction of an education center and the recruitment of national restaurant chains to the area.

Maddox's term limit as a California State Assemblyman was reached in 2004, forcing him out of that office.

Post-Assembly career

2006 Senate Race
He lost a State Senate primary in 2004 to John Campbell, an Assemblyman from a neighboring district. Maddox got 30% of the vote in the primary compared to Campbell's 61% of the vote. Maddox considered running for lieutenant governor in 2006, but ultimately did not.

After leaving office, Maddox worked for a Newport Beach based public affairs company.  He later started his own Sacramento based boutique lobbying firm.  

Maddox would also serve as Vice-President of the California chapter of a national environmental organization and President of a Capistrano Beach, California based faith based non profit.

Board of Equalization
Maddox became Senior Advisor on Legislation and Tax Policy for State Board of Equalization Member Michelle Steel in 2007.

He later served as a Regional Outreach Services Manager.

School Board
In 2008, he was elected to a seat on the Board of Trustees of the Capistrano Unified School District after the incumbent was removed by the electorate in a recall election. He served on the school board for two years.

Emergency Service District

On June 1, 2021, he was appointed as a Commissioner on Emergency Service District 4 for Bexar County, Texas.  This appointment was made by the Bexar County Commissioners Court.

References

External links
Join California Ken Maddox

Succession Box

1964 births
American Lutherans
American municipal police officers
California State Polytechnic University, Pomona alumni
Living people
Members of the California State Assembly
People from Long Beach, California
People from Garden Grove, California
California Republicans
21st-century American politicians
California Democrats